The HKFC Soccer Sevens or Hong Kong Soccer Sevens, formerly known as the International Soccer Sevens, is an annual invitational seven-a-side football tournament which is organised and hosted by Hong Kong Football Club. Held since 1999, many young professional players have made a name for themselves in the tournament including Premier League players Gabriel Agbonlahor, Andreas Weimann, Jack Grealish, Barry Bannan, Rolando Aarons, Hamza Choudhury, Glen Johnson, Anton Ferdinand, David Bentley, Marc Albrighton, Ben Johnson, Jaden Philogene-Bidace, Indiana Vassilev, Cameron Archer, Jeremy Ngakia, Harrison Ashby, Cody Drameh, Sidnei Tavares, Steven Alzate, Kelland Watts, Matty Longstaff, Oskar Buur, Luke Thomas and Kiernan Dewsbury-Hall as well as Scotland internationals Shaun Maloney, Craig Beattie and Chris Burke.

The competition ran from 1999-2019, with a break due to the SARS outbreak in Hong Kong in 2003. In 2020, the organisers confirmed that the competition would not be happening that year due to the ongoing issues in Hong Kong - promising to be back in 2021, but this did not happen with the tournament's website going offline. In 2023, the organisers confirmed that the competition would return after a 4 year hiatus.

Format
 The event features two competitions, a Main Tournament and Masters Tournament. The 16-team Main Tournament is open age group (players must be at least 16) and features mostly youth and academy teams from clubs in Europe playing against more senior players from leagues around Asia.
 The 10-team Masters Tournament is for players aged 35 and over and features former players from Europe's top leagues. Players such as Jürgen Klinsmann, John Barnes, Andy Cole, Matt Le Tissier, Des Walker, Didier Six, Mustapha Hadji, Peter Beardsley, Craig Armstrong, David Johnson, Des Lyttle, Jason Lee, and Michael Thomas have competed in this category.
 Each game has two seven-minute halves with a one-minute half-time break, while the finals are 10 minutes each half with a three-minute break at half-time.
 There are two stages: the group stage followed by the knockout stage. In the Main group stage, teams compete within four groups of four teams each. Each group plays a round-robin tournament, in which each team is scheduled for three matches against other teams in the same group. The top two teams from each group advance to the Cup knockout stage while the bottom two advance to the Plate knockout stage. In the Masters Tournament, the 12 teams are split into three groups of four teams.
 The knockout stage is a single-elimination tournament in which teams play each other in one-off matches, with penalty shootouts and sudden death used to decide the winner if necessary. It begins with the quarter-finals in which the third-placed team plays against the fourth-placed team in Plate and the winner of each group plays against the runner-up of another group in Cup. This is followed by the semi-finals and the final.
 The Main Tournament has an additional Shield competition which is contested by the four losing teams of the Cup quarter-finals. The Shield is also a single-elimination tournament of similar format. The Cup is regarded as the highest honour, followed by the Shield and Plate.

Past winners

References

External links
 Hong Kong Soccer Sevens Official Website

HKFC International Soccer Sevens
Hong Kong football friendly trophies